Figure skating was competed at the 2011 Winter Universiade. Skaters competed in the disciplines of men's singles, ladies' singles, pair skating, ice dancing, and synchronized skating. The competitions took place at the GSIM Yenişehir Ice Hockey Hall between February 1 and 5, 2011.

Medalists

Medal table

External links
 figure skating info
 http://www.isuresults.com/results/wu2011/index.htm

 
2011
Winter Universiade
Winter Universiade 2011